Asthenargellus is a genus of East African dwarf spiders that was first described by Lodovico di Caporiacco in 1949.  it contains only two species, both found in Kenya: A. kastoni and A. meneghettii.

See also
 List of Linyphiidae species

References

Endemic fauna of Kenya
Araneomorphae genera
Linyphiidae
Spiders of Africa